Powerlines F.C. is a South African soccer club. Founded in 1959 as Velocitas F.C., they competed in the National Football League. In March 2012, they were beaten 24–0 in the Nedbank Cup by the Mamelodi Sundowns, a record result.

References

National Football League (South Africa) clubs
Soccer clubs in South Africa
Association football clubs established in 1959